Andrew Makalio (born 22 January 1992) is a New Zealand rugby union player who currently plays as a hooker for  in the Bunnings NPC and the  in the Super Rugby competition.

Early career
Originally from Auckland, Makalio started playing rugby at the age of 15 while attending Onehunga High School. He made his way through the Auckland club rugby scene and was named man of the match as his side, Grammar TEC lifted the Gallaher Shield in 2015. Unable to crack the  Mitre 10 Cup team, he headed south to play for Marlborough based side Harlequins in 2016.

Senior career
Makalio's move south proved to be a fruitful one as after just one season in Marlborough club rugby, he was chosen to replace the departing Quentin MacDonald in the Tasman Mako squad for the 2016 Mitre 10 Cup. He instantly established himself as the first choice in the number 2 jersey, making 11 appearances, 10 of them from the start and scoring 2 tries as the Mako finished as Premiership runners up in 2016. He was part of the Tasman team that won the Mitre 10 Cup in 2019 for the first time. Makalio was selected in the South Island squad for the North vs South rugby union match in 2020 but did not play. In Round 9 of the 2020 Mitre 10 Cup Makalio played his 50th game for the Mako against . The Mako went on to win their second premiership title in a row.

Super Rugby
After just one full season and 11 appearances at provincial level, Makalio was handed a Super Rugby contract by the  ahead of the 2017 Super Rugby season. The side went on to win the title and then backed it up in 2018 and 2019 making it 3 in row. The team also won the Super Rugby Aotearoa competition in 2020.

References

External links

1992 births
Living people
New Zealand rugby union players
Rugby union hookers
Tasman rugby union players
Rugby union players from Auckland
People educated at Onehunga High School
Crusaders (rugby union) players
Barbarian F.C. players
Highlanders (rugby union) players